Iraq competed at the 2017 World Games in Wroclaw, Poland, from 20 July 2017 to 30 July 2017 but failed to win any medals, due to the loss of its only competitor at the Muaythai event in the first round.

Competitors

Muaythai

Only one iraqi Muay Thai Fighter, Akram Al-Qaysi has qualified for the 2017 World Games and was defeated by Ukrainian Sergii Kuliaba via the second round TKO at the 67 kg male division.  

Men's -67 kg - ( Akram Al-Qaysi )  

Kickboxing

Thulfiqar Mohammed Kadhim has qualified for the Men's -81 kg Kickboxing event at the 2017 World Games, but for an unexplained reason he didn't compete and was replaced by another fighter.

References

Nations at the 2017 World Games
2017 in Iraqi sport
Iraq at multi-sport events